The 2006 Houston Astros season was the 45th season for the Houston Astros. The 2006 Astros finished in second place in the National League Central with a record of 82–80, 1½ games behind the eventual World Series champion St. Louis Cardinals, after losing 3–1 to the Braves at Atlanta on the final day of the season.  As a result, they missed the playoffs for the first time since 2003.

Regular season

Standings

National League Central

Record vs. opponents

Transactions
March 30, 2006: Cody Ransom was purchased by the Houston Astros from the Seattle Mariners.
July 12, 2006: Aubrey Huff was traded by the Tampa Bay Devil Rays with cash to the Houston Astros for Ben Zobrist and Mitch Talbot (minors).

Roster

Player stats

Batting
Note: G = Games played; AB = At bats; R = Runs; H = Hits; 2B = Doubles; 3B = Triples; HR = Home runs; RBI = Runs batted in; SB = Stolen bases; BB = Walks; AVG = Batting average; SLG = Slugging percentage

Source:

Pitching
Note: W = Wins; L = Losses; ERA = Earned run average; G = Games pitched; GS = Games started; SV = Saves; IP = Innings pitched; H = Hits allowed; R = Runs allowed; ER = Earned runs allowed; BB = Walks allowed; SO = Strikeouts

Source:

Farm system

LEAGUE CHAMPIONS: Corpus Christi

References

External links
2006 Houston Astros season at Baseball Reference
Game logs:
1st Half: Houston Astros Game Log on ESPN.com
2nd Half: Houston Astros Game Log on ESPN.com
Batting statistics: Houston Astros Batting Stats on ESPN.com
Pitching statistics: Houston Astros Pitching Stats on ESPN.com

Houston Astros seasons
Houston Astros
Houston Astros